The qualifying rounds for the 1998 US Open were played from 25 to 29 August 1998 at the USTA National Tennis Center in Flushing Meadows, New York City, United States.

Seeds

Qualifiers

Lucky losers
  Martín Rodríguez /  André Sá

Draw

First qualifier

Second qualifier

Third qualifier

Fourth qualifier

References
1998 US Open – Men's draws and results at the International Tennis Federation

Men's Doubles Qualifying
US Open (tennis) by year – Qualifying